Thandangorai is a village in the Thanjavur taluk of Thanjavur district, Tamil Nadu, India.

Demographics 

As per the 2001 census, Thandangorai had a total population of 941 with 472 males and 469 females. The sex ratio was 994. The literacy rate was 68.33.

References 

 

Villages in Thanjavur district